Oxime V is a chemical compound that has been studied as a potential sweetener.  Oxime V was first reported in 1976 as a synthetic analog of the artificial sweetener perillartine.  It is about 450 times as sweet as sucrose and is more water-soluble than perillartine. Its metabolism and toxicology have been investigated, and it has been found to have promising properties, but it is not currently marketed.

In 2022, oxime V was identified in citrus.

References

Oximes
Sugar substitutes